The men's halfpipe event in snowboarding at the 2002 Winter Olympics was held in Park City, United States. The competition took place on 11 February 2002.

The American sweep of the medal podium was the first for that country since the 1956 Winter Olympics, when they won all three medals in the men's singles in figure skating.

Medalists

Results

The halfpipe event for men took place on 11 February 2002, both the qualification rounds and the finals taking place on that day. Fortythirty snowboarders took part in the qualification, the top twelve of whom move on to the finals.

In the qualification round, each snowboarder was given two runs to be in the top six of that run. Regardless of how many points the person received, as long as they placed in the top six, they advanced to the finals. If the person qualified in the first run, they did not need to do a second run in the qualification. The finals proceeded in a similar fashion. The twelve qualifiers had two runs in which to score the highest possible points. The snowboarders were ranked by their highest score, and medals were awarded accordingly. The following is a table detailing the results of the qualification and finals runs of the competing snowboarders.

References

Snowboarding at the 2002 Winter Olympics
Men's events at the 2002 Winter Olympics